Joey Hauser (born July 17, 1999) is an American college basketball player for the Michigan State Spartans of the Big Ten Conference. He previously played for the Marquette Golden Eagles.

High school career
Hauser attended Stevens Point Area Senior High School in Stevens Point, Wisconsin. He helped his team win three straight Division 1 state titles. As a junior, he averaged 23.6 points, 11.5 rebounds and 5.1 assists per game, earning unanimous All-State and Wisconsin Valley Conference Co-Player of the Year recognition. In December 2017, he suffered a season-ending ankle injury which required surgery, re-aggravating an existing injury. One month later, Hauser graduated early from high school. A four-star recruit, he committed to playing college basketball for Marquette over offers from Wisconsin and Michigan State, among others.

College career
After graduating early from high school, Hauser enrolled at Marquette for the spring 2018 semester due to an open scholarship on the team. He sat out as a redshirt while rehabilitating from his ankle injury. On January 26, 2019, Hauser scored a freshman season-high 21 points in an 87–82 win over Xavier. As a freshman, he averaged 9.7 points and 5.3 rebounds per game. He was named to the Big East All-Freshman Team and was a five-time Big East Freshman of the Week selection. After the season, Hauser transferred to Michigan State. He sat out his next season due to National Collegiate Athletic Association transfer rules, with his appeal for immediate eligibility being denied. Hauser averaged 9.7 points and 5.6 rebounds per game as a redshirt junior, and earned First-team Academic All-District recognition.

Career statistics

College

|-
| style="text-align:left;"| 2018–19
| style="text-align:left;"| Marquette
| 34 || 31 || 29.2 || .447 || .425 || .791 || 5.3 || 2.4 || .4 || .1 || 9.7
|-
| style="text-align:left;"| 2019–20
| style="text-align:left;"| Michigan State
| style="text-align:center;" colspan="11"|  Redshirt
|-
| style="text-align:left;"| 2020–21
| style="text-align:left;"| Michigan State
| 28 || 16 || 21.5 || .475 || .340 || .721 || 5.6 || 1.4 || .4 || .2 || 9.7
|-
| style="text-align:left;"| 2021–22
| style="text-align:left;"| Michigan State
| 35 || 29 || 22.2 || .446 || .408 || .862 || 5.3 || 1.7 || .3 || .2 || 7.3
|-
| style="text-align:left;"| 2022–23
| style="text-align:left;"| Michigan State
| 32 || 32 || 33.9 || .488 || .465 || .871 || 7.0 || 1.9 || .4 || .2 || 14.3
|- class="sortbottom"
| style="text-align:center;" colspan="2"| Career
| 129 || 108 || 26.8 || .466 || .416 || .811 || 5.8 || 1.9 || .4 || .2 || 10.2

Personal life
Hauser is the son of Dave and Stephanie Hauser.  Hauser's older brother, Sam, played college basketball with him at Marquette before transferring to Virginia and in the NBA for the Boston Celtics. They also played together in high school. Hauser also has an older sister, Nicole Hauser who played volleyball at Southern Connecticut State University.

References

External links
Michigan State Spartans bio
Marquette Golden Eagles bio

1999 births
Living people
American men's basketball players
Basketball players from Wisconsin
Marquette Golden Eagles men's basketball players
Michigan State Spartans men's basketball players
People from Stevens Point, Wisconsin
Power forwards (basketball)
Sportspeople from Green Bay, Wisconsin